Radio24syv (English: "Radio 24 seven") was a Danish public service radio station sending talk radio. The radio station was financed by public money through mandatory licence fees, but was privately owned by Berlingske Media and PeopleGroup. The public funding was followed by requirements about the types of programs the radio station should broadcast.

The radio station was untraditional and provocative, and has been credited with reviving Danish talk radio.

The satire show program The Short Radio News was among its most popular programs.

History

Establishment 
In 2010, shortly after he was appointed as new Minister of Culture, Per Stig Møller floated the idea of a new country-wide radio channel. A few months later, political negotiations regarding media concluded with a political agreement between the incumbent Venstre-Conservative government, and Danish People's Party and Liberal Alliance, it's parliamentary support. A part of that agreement was the establishment of a new privately owned radio station, financed by public money, meant to compete with DR P1, operated by the state-owned DR. Following the announcement, the coming radio channel was given the nickname "Radio Møller", in reference to the Minister of Culture.

In January 2011, the new radio channel was sent in public procurement. While several actors in the Danish media marked planned to launch a bid, at least two consortiums declined (JP/Politikens Hus and Danish TV 2; and Dagbladet Information, Fynske Medier and Douglas Entertainment), as they felt the very detailed requirement in the procurement threatened their editorial freedom. Eventually, only one actor made a bid, a consortium consisting of Berlingske Media and PeopleGroup, and in April 2011, they were rewarded the procurement. They named the station "Radio24syv", and it started broadcasting on 1 November 2011.

Tenure 
In December 2012, the radio changed its slogan from "Denmark's new talk radio" to "Room for differences" (Danish: "Højt til loftet").

In May 2015, radio host Asger Juhl killed a rabbit, by hitting it with a bike pump, during a morning program about animal welfare. The purpose was to highlight the hypocrisy about people's relation to animals while eating meat. During the program, television personality Linse Kessler tried to prevent the killing. The rabbit was eaten by Juhl and his co-host Kristoffer Eriksen that evening. The killing gained international attention and sparked many angry reaction, with the hosts receiving death threats. The killing was defended by the radio, as the rabbit was eaten and not thrown out.

On 19 November 2018, former gang leader and radio host of Police Radio Nedim Yasar was shot and died the following day. After leaving his criminal life behind, Yasar had become a mentor for troubled youths, and talked about his experience. A book about Yasar's life, written by his co-host Marie Louise Toksvig, had just been released, and Yasar was shot when he left the book reception. In December 2018, three men was arrested and charged with murder in the case, with a fourth following in January 2019. The case is expected to go to trial in January 2020.

2019 closure 
In March 2019, Radio24syv announced that they would not apply to have their broadcasting license renewed when it was to expire on 31 October 2019, effectively closing the radio station. The decision was based on a new political requirement that at least 70% of all editorial staff should be situated at least 110 km from Copenhagenit was a wish from the Danish People's Party (DPP) that the station was moved to Jutland. Originally, in a June 2018 political agreement, the requirement was that 50% of all editorial staff and all administrative staff should be placed in Jutland, but as such a requirement for administrative staff turned out to be against EU law, they were changed in later political negotiations. Following the announcement, the DPP was met with heavy criticism, with chief of programs, Mads Brügger, calling it "a victory for pettiness and vindictiveness" and "harassment" by DPP. Two weeks later, DPP said that while they would not change the requirements, they were open to see if Radio24syv could survive in another form.

Eventually, only one party applied for the license, and the FM channel was in July awarded to Radio4, which is owned by a consortium headed by Jysk Fynske Medier, for the following eight years. The license was followed by funding of 108 million DKK the first year, falling to 93 million DKK the last.

In May, the government and DPP announced an agreement that should make it possible for Radio24syv to continue broadcasting. The agreement launched a new talk radio station, which was to broadcast via DAB instead of over FM. This new station would receive yearly funding of 70 million DKK, and would not have any geographic requirements. This station replaced another planned DAB station with focus on culture and classical music, which was dropped. In August, the owners of Radio24syv announced that they intended to apply for the new DAB station. Companies interested in the originally planned DAB station decided to withdraw from the contest, with Bauer Media calling the process "a joke", and Le Gammeltoft from Heartbeats saying that the procurement was already decided in favor of Radio24syv.

Radio24syv surprisingly lost the procurement to Radio Loud, a channel aimed at young listeners and owned by local radio channels in partnership with a number of cultural institutions. Both Loud's application and the decision, taken by the governmental Radio and TV Board on 22 October, to grant them the channel was heavily criticized. Their application was written in just over a month, and Sebastian Dorset, intended to be responsible for satire, was contacted two days prior to the deadline. The Radio and TV Board twice raised doubts that Loud could fulfill the minimum requirements, but did not disqualify them. Media experts warned that Loud's partnership model could mean that they were used for advertisement for their partners, and could distort competition. Media expert Lasse Jensen called the closure "the most absurd media-political process, he had ever seen".

The Radio and TV Board evaluated the applications using a point system, where program plans was weighted 40%, quality and realism 35%, and economy 25%. Ultimately, economy was the greatest factor for Loud's win. On a scale from 0 to 8, both Radio24syv and Loud got between 6-7 points on the first two categories, but on economy Loud received 7 points, while Radio24syv received only 1 point. Radio24syv had applied for the full funding of 280 million DKK over four years, while Loud had applied for 261 million DKK. The third bidder, dk4, had applied for 256 million DKK, and was awarded 8 points. According to experts, the model used caused the economy to be of more importance than the 25% implies. While the model was known in advance, the estimated lowest bidder, which determined the variance, was not. Experts said Radio24syv had been sloppy in their application, and that they were too confident in themselves. Jakob Kvist replied by saying that their bid was to continue Radio24syv, and that contentwise the evaluation was "completely incomprehensible". Mathematicians have found errors in the calculations of points, but not enough to change the overall result alone.

The surprising result led to the involvement of politicians. Two days after the announcement, the Danish Social Liberal Party said they wanted a rerun of the procurement, with Jens Rohde saying it was not fair because Radio24syv would cover all of Denmark, but Loud would not. Applicants could choose between two different DAB nets and Loud choose one that only covers about 82% of Denmark, which was sufficient to be considered nation-wide. Liberal Alliance and The New Right later joined in, also wanting a rerun. Other parties demanded an explanation from the acting Minister of Culture, Rasmus Prehn. Experts warned that the political involvement threatened the arm's length principle. On 28 October, Prehn said the Radio and TV Board should answer all the questions that the applicants might have. Radio24syv sent in almost 70 questions. In their answers, given on 1 November, the Radio and TV board dismissed the criticism, and stood by their decision.

Radio24syv ended their broadcasting on 31 October 2019 by playing Fanfare for the Common Man live from their roof.

On 5 November, after a meeting between the acting Minister of Culture, the Radio and TV board, and spokespersons from the political parties, Prehn said that it was not legally possible to reopen the procurement. On 23 November, Radio24syv sued the Radio and TV board; a lawsuit financed by the Civil Rights Foundation.

Leadership 
Jørgen Ramskov has been CEO of radio24syv for its entire broadcast period. However, in May 2019 he announced that he would leave the station, when the current broadcast permit runs out on 31 October 2019. In August 2019, Jakob Kvist was announced as new CEO and editor-en-chief, should they gain the new DAB-permit.

Originally, Suzanne Moll was editor-in-chief, and leader of the news department, but in November 2013, it was announced that she had quit, effective from the end of January 2013. Jørgen Ramskov took over both of her responsibilities, while a new administrative leader were hired. In August 2014 Simon Andersen became leader of the news department. In September 2018 Kristoffer Eriksen succeeded him in that job.

To lead the program department, Mikael Bertelsen and Mads Brügger were hired as channel chief prior to the station starting to air. In November 2012, after Moll had quit, but before it was announced, Brügger was fired effective immediately by Ramskov. The firing were caused by a split between the program department and the news department, and an underlying disagreement about how the channel should evolve, with both Bertelsen and Brügger experimenting, while Moll stood for the serious. After only 32 days, Brügger were re-hired in the same job, but now both his and Bertelsen's job title renamed to program chiefs instead of channel chiefs.

Recurring programs 

Source: https://www.24syv.dk/programmer

Other programs 
These program also aired:

Dødsruten, report series from Tingbjerg, 25 timer
Ibens, stories from Denmark with room for space and time, 1 hour weekly
Interne affærer, channel chiefs evaluates and answer on criticism, cancelled
Jagten på Røde Oktober, program series about the collective movement 2 October, 5 hours
Monogram, a colorful embrace of Danish music in a talk program, 2 hours regularly
Reporterne, collects the loose ends in today's newsflow, 3 hours Monday-Friday
Skriftestolen, panel program about faith and existensialism, 1 hour weekly
Syvkabalen, portrait program with seven pieces of music from a well-known dane, 2 hours weekly
Wiki-værkstedet, conversations starting from the Danish Wikipedia, 1 hour weekly
Zornigs Zone, the socially vulnerable, with Lisbeth Zornig Andersen, 1 hour weekly

References 

Radio24syv
Radio stations in Denmark
Radio stations established in 2011
Radio stations disestablished in 2019
Defunct radio stations
Defunct mass media in Denmark